The R427 road is a regional road in Ireland, which runs southwest-northeast from the R425 in County Laois to the R417 in County Kildare.

En route it passes through Vicarstown and Stradbally and crosses the Grand Canal and the River Barrow.

See also
Roads in Ireland
National primary road
National secondary road

References
Roads Act 1993 (Classification of Regional Roads) Order 2006 – Department of Transport

Regional roads in the Republic of Ireland
Roads in County Laois
Roads in County Kildare